The Wilton Paes de Almeida Building was a high-rise building in Largo do Paissandú, São Paulo, Brazil, that was built in the 1960s. It was listed as a historic building in 1992. It was the headquarters of the Federal Police in São Paulo from the 1980s until 2003, after which it was occupied by squatters. It caught fire and collapsed on 1 May 2018, causing at least 7 fatalities.

Building 
The modernist building was designed by Roger Zmekhol. It was built between 1961 and 1968 by Morse & Bierrenbach. The structure's columns were made of steel and steel-reinforced concrete, which supported cantilevered floor slabs of ribbed concrete. An aluminum-framed glass curtain wall wrapped the exterior of the building. It was located at 22 Rua Antonio de Godói in the República area of São Paulo, adjacent to the Evangelical Lutheran Church of São Paulo. It had 24 floors.

It was one of the first buildings in São Paulo with a glass façade, with air conditioning built in to keep the façade clear. It had a marble and stainless steel hall. The building was considered a property of historical, architectural and landscape interest, which guaranteed the preservation of its external characteristics. In 1992 it was listed by CONPRESP (Municipal Council for the Preservation of Historic, Cultural and Environmental Heritage of the City of São Paulo). 

The building was initially owned by businessman and politician Sebastião Paes de Almeida, and housed various companies. Debts meant that the building was taken over by the federal government. It housed the headquarters of the Federal Police in São Paulo between the 1980s and 2003, and was also the headquarters of INSS (Instituto Nacional do Seguro Social) before being abandoned and occupied by squatters. It was put up for sale in 2015 for around R$20 million.

Fire and collapse 
The fire started on the fifth floor of the building at around 4:20am GMT (1:20 a.m. local time) at the first hours of 2 May 2018 (late night of 1 May, May Day holiday), and collapsed about 90 minutes later. The cause of the fire was a short-circuit in a power strip connected to a microwave, TV and refrigerator. The fire spread to an adjacent building, which was not in danger of collapse. The central part of the adjacent Evangelical Lutheran Church of São Paulo was also destroyed during the collapse of the building.

At the time of the fire, 372 people (146 families) were occupying the building. Makeshift wooden living structures helped to spread the fire throughout the building, with the empty shafts where lifts had formerly been acting like a chimney. Around 160 firefighters attended the scene. At least one person died, who was being rescued using a steel rope when the building collapsed.  The exact number of deaths and injuries are still unknown since the building was mostly occupied by homeless squatters. Initially, the fire was thought to have been caused by a gas explosion.

As of 18 May, 2 residents of the building are still missing. The first body was found on 4 May, with six people missing. Prior to collapse, the building had recently been surveyed, and no structural risk had been reported; this investigation was reopened after the collapse, along with a new inspection of 70 other buildings in São Paulo.

References 

2018 fires in South America
Buildings and structures in São Paulo
Former skyscrapers
Collapsed buildings and structures
Office buildings completed in 1968
Fires in Brazil
May 2018 events in South America
Building collapses in 2018
2018 in Brazil
Building collapses caused by fire